Ellisville is a city in St. Louis County, Missouri, United States within Greater St. Louis. It is a  western outer-ring suburb of St. Louis. The population was 9,985 at the 2020 census.

In 2009, Money magazine ranked Ellisville #25 on the annual Best Places to Live in America list. The city is also currently home to an EPA Superfund site.

History 
Ellisville was settled by Captain James Harvey Ferris of Kentucky before 1837. He brought slaves with him when he settled his property south of Manchester and west of Kiefer Creek Road, and it was here the house that became known as the "Ellis House" was constructed. The bricks used for construction of the house were handmade by the slaves; it was also called the "Brick Place" for this reason.

Captain Ferris sold the house to Vespasian Ellis, a newspaper editor in St. Louis. The Old School Democrat, the Native American Bulletin, the Washington Temperance Paper, and The Native American were among Ellis' work. In 1842, Ellis became the United States consul to Venezuela. He ran several ads in the Native American Bulletin in an effort to sell his Ellisville farm. As a result, it was sold to William A. Hereford in 1842 or 1843. Hereford was a Virginian and is credited with the naming of Ellisville after his former post office in Ellisville, Virginia. Hereford opened the first post office here on May 2, 1843. Some believe that the Ellis House itself actually served as the post office for a time. All historical accounts of the area give the same history, but none state clearly whether the town was named for Vespasian Ellis or by William Hereford for his Virginia post office.

Hereford sold to Samuel Wilson, and he sold to Major Clarkson of Kentucky for whom Clarkson Road is named. Major Clarkson sold to Captain Benjamin F. Hutchinson of Kentucky, a steamboat captain and the owner of at least three steamboats. Captain Hutchinson raised fine horses and planted extensive orchards, greatly improving the surrounding countryside. In 1868, Captain Hutchinson subdivided his farm into small lots.

Adam Doering purchased the brick house and a considerable portion of the land. John Henry William Rasch purchased the house about 1896 from the Doerings. The Ellisville House stood until 1969 when it was razed.

Geography
Ellisville is located at  (38.594003, -90.587490).

There are two primary arterial roads which bisect Ellisville: Missouri Route 100 (Manchester Road) and Missouri Route 340 (Clarkson Road). Ellisville is bordered by the city of Clarkson Valley to the north, the city of Ballwin to the east and southeast, unincorporated St. Louis County to the south, and the city of Wildwood to the west.

Demographics

2020 census
As of the 2020 census, there were 9,985 people and 3,820 households living in the city. The racial makeup of the city was 82.5% White, 2.5% African American, 0.2% Native American, 7.3% Asian, 1.2% from other races, and 6.3% from two or more races. Hispanic or Latino of any race were 4.1% of the population.

2010 census
As of the census of 2010, there were 9,169 people, 3,669 households, and 2,469 families living in the city. The racial makeup of the city was 91.7% White, 1.9% African American, 0.1% Native American, 4.3% Asian, 0.6% from other races, and 1.4% from two or more races. Hispanic or Latino of any race were 2.4% of the population.

There were 3,621 households, of which 31.8% had children under the age of 18 living with them, 57.6% were married couples living together, 8.3% had a female householder with no husband present, 3.1% had a male householder with no wife present, and 31.0% were non-families. 27.5% of all households were made up of individuals, and 16.2% had someone living alone who was 65 years of age or older. The average household size was 2.47 and the average family size was 3.04.

The median age in the city was 44.7 years. 23.7% of residents were under the age of 18; 5.7% were between the ages of 18 and 24; 21% were from 25 to 44; 29.7% were from 45 to 64; and 19.8% were 65 years of age or older. The gender makeup of the city was 46.7% male and 53.3% female.

2000 census
As of the census of 2000, there were 9,104 people, 3,209 households, and 2,486 families living in the city. The racial makeup of the city was 95.11% White, 1.58% African American, 0.11% Native American, 2.05% Asian, 0.38% from other races, and 0.76% from two or more races. Hispanic or Latino of any race were 1.16% of the population.

There were 3,209 households, out of which 39.7% had children under the age of 18 living with them, 66.9% were married couples living together, 8.2% had a female householder with no husband present, and 22.5% were non-families. 19.4% of all households were made up of individuals, and 9.3% had someone living alone who was 65 years of age or older. The average household size was 2.74 and the average family size was 3.16.

In the city the population was spread out, with 27.2% under the age of 18, 5.7% from 18 to 24, 28.7% from 25 to 44, 23.8% from 45 to 64, and 14.6% who were 65 years of age or older. The median age was 39 years. For every 100 females, there were 91.2 males. For every 100 females age 18 and over, there were 86.8 males.

The median income for a household in the city was $65,016, and the median income for a family was $74,375. Males had a median income of $55,224 versus $32,062 for females. The per capita income for the city was $27,379. About 1.9% of families and 3.5% of the population were below the poverty line, including 3.3% of those under age 18 and 5.4% of those age 65 or over.

Transportation

Highways and major roads 
Missouri Route 340 (Clarkson Road) runs on north-south through much of Ellisville before turning into Kiefer Creek Road. Missouri Route 100 (Manchester Road) runs east-west through Ellisville.

Public transportation 
Public transportation is provided by Metro and connects Ellisville to many other portions of Greater St. Louis by bus routes.

Attractions 
The Ellisville Dog Park, which opened in October 2012 is located in Bluebird Park.

Education
The St. Louis County Library Daniel Boone Branch and Asian Center is located in Ellisville.

Public Schools 
Ellisville Elementary, Ridge Meadows Elementary, and Crestview Middle are three schools in the Rockwood School District, and located in Ellisville.

Private Schools 
The following schools are within the city limits of Ellisville: St. Clare of Assisi and St. John Lutheran School

References

External links
 City of Ellisville official website

Cities in St. Louis County, Missouri
Cities in Missouri